Creurgops is a genus of Neotropical birds in the tanager family Thraupidae. They are found in the canopy of humid montane forest in the Andes of South America.

These are relatively large and heavy-billed tanagers. They are mainly slaty grey above and rufous below, except in the male slaty tanager where the underparts also are slaty grey. Males of both species have a crown patch, which is lacking in the females. They commonly participate in mixed-species flocks.

Taxonomy and species list
The genus Creurgops was introduced in 1858 by the English zoologist Philip Sclater to accommodate the newly described rufous-crested tanager (Creurgops verticalis). The genus name combines the Ancient Greek kreourgos  meaning "butcher" with ōps meaning "appearance". The genus now contains two species.

References

 Restall, R. L., C. Rodner, & M. Lentino. (2006). Birds of Northern South America. Christopher Helm, London.  (vol. 1).  (vol. 2).
 Schulenberg, T., D. Stotz, D. Lane, J. O' Neill, & T. Parker III. (2007). Birds of Peru. Christopher Helm, London. 

 
Bird genera
Taxa named by Philip Sclater